Love Revolution is the eighth album release by Christian singer Natalie Grant. It was released on August 24, 2010. Four singles were released from the album: "Human", "Greatness of our God", "Your Great Name", and "Alive".

Track listing

Awards
The album was nominated for a Dove Award for Pop/Contemporary Album of the Year at the 42nd GMA Dove Awards.

Charts

Weekly charts

Year-end charts

References

2010 albums
Natalie Grant albums
Curb Records albums